Jonathan Felipe Rougier (born 29 October 1987) is an Argentine-Honduran football player who currently plays as a goalkeeper for F.C. Motagua in the Liga Nacional in Honduras.

Club career
Rougier was promoted from Club Atlético Colón to Primera B Nacional side Boca Unidos in 2009 by coach Frank Kudelka.  By 2011, he was transferred to Textil Mandiyú and to Club Defensores de Pronunciamiento in 2012 where he gained promotion to Torneo Federal A.  His first international experience was with Honduran club F.C. Motagua in 2017, winning a league title immediately.  He also won the best goalkeeper award in Honduras in 2018.  Later that year, he was included in the list for Goalkeeper of the Year at the 2018 CONCACAF Awards.

Honours

Individual
CONCACAF League Golden Glove: 2019

References 

1987 births
Living people
Association football goalkeepers
Argentine footballers
Boca Unidos footballers
F.C. Motagua players
Primera Nacional players
Liga Nacional de Fútbol Profesional de Honduras players
Argentina international footballers
Sportspeople from Entre Ríos Province